Puerto Nariño is the second municipality of the Amazonas department of Colombia, located on the shore of the Amazon River.

It has about 6,000 residents, most of them are indigenous (from the Ticuna tribe) and its specificity is that it is entirely pedestrian, no car or motorcycle being allowed, as an experiment in an ecological community. The traffic with the smaller communities along the river, and with Leticia, the only other Colombian municipality in the region, takes place by motorboats.

Its name comes from a famous Colombian general, Antonio Nariño, who took an active part in the independence war against the Spanish occupiers.

Geography

Puerto Nariño is the second municipality of the Amazonas department.  It is on the edge of the River Loretoyaco, 67 km from Leticia and 1240 km from Bogota.  The average temperature is 30°C.

History
The town was founded on 1961 August 18 by a doctor named Jose Humberto Espejo Hernandez.

Climate
Puerto Nariño has a tropical rainforest climate (Köppen Af) with heavy to very heavy rainfall year-round.

References

 Puerto Nariño official website

Municipalities of Amazonas Department
Populated places on the Amazon
Populated places established in 1961
1961 establishments in Colombia